B. N. Manjunatha Reddy was the 49th Mayor of Bengaluru. 
He was elected from Madiwala ward belonging to BTM layout assembly constituency from Indian National Congress party. He got elected as Mayor on 11 September 2015.

Early life and family
Born on 22 September 1962 to a farmer family, Mr Reddy was brought up in Bommanahalli at Bengaluru, Karnataka as the third son to Late Sri. Narayana Reddy and Smt Lakshmamma. Manjunatha Reddy moved to Madiwala in his early teenage for his education and holds a bachelor's degree in arts.

References

Mayors of Bangalore
Indian National Congress politicians from Karnataka
Living people
1962 births